Henri Munyaneza (born 18 March 1983) is a retired Rwandan football striker. He was capped for the Rwanda national football team at the 2004 African Cup of Nations.

References

1983 births
Living people
People from Kigali
Rwandan footballers
Rwanda international footballers
2004 African Cup of Nations players
S.C. Kiyovu Sports players
APR F.C. players
Rayon Sports F.C. players
K.A.S. Eupen players
C.S. Visé players
SHB Da Nang FC players
Rwandan expatriate footballers
Expatriate footballers in Belgium
Rwandan expatriate sportspeople in Belgium
Expatriate footballers in Vietnam
Rwandan expatriate sportspeople in Vietnam
Expatriate footballers in Greece
Rwandan expatriate sportspeople in Greece
Association football forwards